is a Japanese actress. Perhaps her best-known role is as Commander Aya Odagiri (aka "Chokan") in the Super Sentai series Chōjin Sentai Jetman. She also starred in Gosei Sentai Dairanger as the mother of Ko/Kiba Ranger.

TV Roles
Dennou Keisatsu Cybercop (1988-1989) - ZAC Officer Miho Asakuza
Chōjin Sentai Jetman (1991-1992) - Commander Aya Odagiri
Gosei Sentai Dairanger (1993-1994) - Ko's Mother
Chouriki Sentai Ohranger (1995) - Masao's Mother
Jirai wo Fundara Sayonara (1999)
Kamen Rider Ex-Aid (2016) - Doctor

Voice Roles

Dubbing Roles
Stargate SG-1 (Janet Fraiser)

References 

1960 births
Living people
Japanese actresses